UMAX is a domestic interline intermodal freight transport program that provides shipping and logistics of containers. The program is a partnership; its parent companies are Union Pacific Railroad and CSX. 

Launched March 29, 2010, UMAX has a fleet of over 20,000 domestic  containers. The service traverses major cities throughout the United States.

See also
J.B. Hunt
Schneider National
Hub Group
Swift
Pacer International
Matson Navigation

References

Logistics companies of the United States
American companies established in 2010
Transport companies established in 2010
Intermodal containers